Casson Ferguson (May 29, 1891 – February 12, 1929) was an American film actor of the silent era.  He appeared in more than 50 films between 1917 and 1928. 

His father was John J. Ferguson, a jeweler in Alexandria, Louisiana. Early in his career Casson was a member of the Mantel Shakespeare Players in New Orleans before moving to California to pursue a movie career, first with the Seelig Company, then as a leading man. In 1928 he toured Europe and performed as a singer and actor in London and Paris. Returning to California, he married Catherine Mallon. Not long after he died of pneumonia at the age of 38; two days later his wife Catherine also died of pneumonia, and her mother soon died of pneumonia.

Partial filmography

 The Mystery of No. 47 (1917) - Buffington
 Face Value (1918) - Louis Maguire
 The Shuttle (1918) - G. Selden
 Unclaimed Goods (1918) - Cocopah Kid
 Mile-a-Minute Kendall (1918) - Eddie Semper
 The Only Road (1918) - Bob Armstrong
 How Could You Jean? (1918) - Ted Burton Jr
 Alias Mary Brown (1918) - Dick Browning, aka Mary Brown
 The Gypsy Trail (1918) - Michael Rudder
 Jane Goes A-Wooing (1919) - Micky Donovan
 The Drifters (1919) - Hugh MacLaren
 Johnny Get Your Gun (1919) - Bert Whitney
 Partners Three (1919) - Arthur Gould
 Putting It Over (1919) - Perkins
 Secret Service (1919) - Wilfred Varney
 Flame of the Desert (1919) - Sir Charles Channing
 Peg o' My Heart (1919) - Alaric Chicester
 The Prince Chap (1920) - Jack, Earl of Huntington
 Merely Mary Ann (1920) - Lancelot
 Madame X (1920) - Raymond Floriot
 The Mutiny of the Elsinore (1920) - Dick Somers
 Bunty Pulls the Strings (1921) - Jeemy
 The Unknown Wife (1921) - Donald Grant
 What's a Wife Worth? (1921) - Bruce Morrison
 At the End of the World (1921)
 A Virginia Courtship (1921) - Tom Fairfax
 The Law and the Woman (1922) - Phil Long
 The Truthful Liar (1922) - Arthur Sinclair
 Over The Border (1922) - Val Galbraith
 Borderland (1922) - Clyde Meredith
 Manslaughter (1922) - Bobby Dorest
 Drums of Fate (1923) - David Verne
 Grumpy (1923) - Chamberlin Jarvis
 A Gentleman of Leisure (1923) - Sir Spencer Deever
 Her Reputation (1923) - Jack Calhoun
 The Road to Yesterday (1925) - Adrian Thompkyns
 The Wedding Song (1925) - Madison Melliah
 Cobra (1925) - Jack Dorning
 Forbidden Waters (1926) - Sylvester
 For Alimony Only (1926) - Bertie Waring
 The King of Kings (1927) - Scribe
 Tenth Avenue (1928) - Curley

References

External links

1891 births
1929 deaths
American male film actors
American male silent film actors
Male actors from Louisiana
20th-century American male actors